Auxerre-Saint-Gervais station is a railway station serving the town Auxerre, Yonne department, central France. The station is served by regional trains towards Dijon, Paris, Corbigny and Avallon.

References

External links
 

Railway stations in Bourgogne-Franche-Comté